Gianluca Cologna (born 17 May 1990) is a retired Swiss cross-country skier. His brother Dario Cologna is also a professional cross-country skier. He competed in the 2014 Winter Olympics in the Men's team sprint with his brother Dario and finished 5th in the final.  He achieved his only individual podium in December 2013 with a third place finish in the Classic Sprint in Asiago, Italy.

His retirement, after undergoing surgeries for shoulder and knee injuries, was first reported by the Swiss media on 25 March 2018 and confirmed by Cologna himself on his Facebook and Instagram accounts a few days later.

Cross-country skiing results
All results are sourced from the International Ski Federation (FIS).

Olympic Games

World Championships

World Cup

Season standings

Individual podiums
 1 podium – (1 )

References

External links
Official website 

1990 births
Cross-country skiers at the 2014 Winter Olympics
Living people
Olympic cross-country skiers of Switzerland
Swiss male cross-country skiers